Demetrida acutangula is a species of ground beetle in Lebiinae subfamily. It was described by Fauvel in 1882 and is endemic to New Caledonia.

References

Beetles described in 1882
Insects of New Caledonia
Taxa named by Charles Adolphe Albert Fauvel
acutangula